Shinmi, born Kim Su-seong was a Buddhist monk during the early Joseon dynasty. He was depicted in the 2019 film The King's Letters for his role in the creation of Hangul.

He came from the Yeongdong (Yeongsan) Kim clan. In its genealogy records, it was said that Shinmi was active as a scholar before his death, but there is no such record in the annals of the Joseon Dynasty.

See also
Joseon dynasty

External links
Shinmi on Encykorea .

Korean Buddhist monks
Joseon Buddhist monks